Bozioru is a commune in Buzău County, Muntenia, Romania. It is composed of ten villages: Bozioru, Buduile, Fișici, Găvanele, Gresia, Izvoarele, Nucu, Scăeni, Ulmet and Văvălucile.

References

Communes in Buzău County
Localities in Muntenia